The Shanghai–Kunming Railway or Hukun Railway, also known as the Hukun Line, is a major arterial railroad across eastern, south central and southwest China. It connects Shanghai, whose shorthand name is Hu, and Kunming. Major cities along route include Shanghai, Jiaxing, Hangzhou, Yiwu, Jinhua, Shangrao, Yingtan, Pingxiang, Zhuzhou, Huaihua, Kaili, Guiyang, Anshun, Qujing, and Kunming.

Line description
The entire line is electrified.

The Shanghai–Kunming high-speed railway runs parallel to the Shanghai–Kunming Railway.

History
The Shanghai–Kunming Railway has four major segments, which were built over a span of 70 years. In 2006, after the Ministry of Railways rebuilt sections along route and increased train travel speed, the four lines were collectively referred to as one.

 Shanghai–Hangzhou Railway (Huhang Line ),  in length, was built between 1906 and 1909 and connects Shanghai and Hangzhou.
 Zhejiang–Jiangxi Railway (Zhegan Line ),  in length, was built between 1899 and 1926 and connected Hangzhou, the capital of Zhejiang Province, with Zhuzhou, in northern Hunan province.
 Hunan–Guizhou Railway (Xiangqian Line ),  in length, was begun in 1937, halted in 1939 by World War II, restarted in 1953 and completed in 1975. It runs from Zhuzhou to Guiyang, capital of Guizhou Province.
 Guiyang–Kunming Railway (Guikun Line ),  in length, was built between 1958 and 1970, and connects Guiyang and Kunming. It was electrified in 1980.

Accidents 
On May 23, 2010 (UTC+8), a passenger train derailed after heavy rains caused mudslides on the Hukun Line in Jiangxi Province, killing 19 passengers and injuring 71.

External links
 Documentary about the Guikun line.

See also
 List of railways in China

References

Railway lines in China
Rail transport in Shanghai
Rail transport in Zhejiang
Rail transport in Jiangxi
Rail transport in Hunan
Rail transport in Guizhou
Rail transport in Yunnan

25 kV AC railway electrification